Psoas  (from Greek ψόας) can refer to:
 Psoas major muscle
 Psoas minor muscle
 Psoas sign